The Royalist is a 1682 comedy play by the English writer Thomas D'Urfey. It was staged at the Dorset Garden Theatre by the Duke's Company, shortly before the merger that created the United Company. It is set during the Commonwealth Era following the English Civil War.

The original cast featured William Smith as Sir Charles Kinglove, Joseph Williams as Heartall, John Bowman as Broom, Anthony Leigh as  Sir Oliver Oldcut, Thomas Jevon as Sir Paul Eitherside, Thomas Percival as Captain Jonas, Cave Underhill as Copyhold, George Bright as Slouch and Mary Betterton as Camilla.

References

Bibliography
 Canfield, J. Douglas. Tricksters and Estates: On the Ideology of Restoration Comedy. University Press of Kentucky, 2014.
 Van Lennep, W. The London Stage, 1660-1800: Volume One, 1660-1700. Southern Illinois University Press, 1960.

1682 plays
West End plays
Restoration comedy
Plays by Thomas d'Urfey